Shree Devi Entertainers is an Indian Film production company created by H.K. Prakash, which operates in the Kannada Film Industry (KFI).

Films Produced

Awards

Notes

References 

Film production companies based in Bangalore
2016 establishments in Karnataka
Indian companies established in 2015
Mass media companies established in 2015